GTB Nagar is an upscale residential neighborhood in the Kareli neighborhood of Allahabad. It was developed by Allahabad Development Authority.

Neighbourhoods in Allahabad